Dolphin Sailing System is a 1986 video game published by BCI Software.

Gameplay
Dolphin Sailing System is a game in which the player learns to sail a sailboat.

Reception
Russell Sipe reviewed the game for Computer Gaming World, and stated that "DSS offers a lot of value, especially if you are interesting in sailing beyond the confines of your computer screen."

References

External links
Entry in Game Player's Guide to MS-DOS Computer Games
Article in Computer Play
Article in PC Games
Entry in Computers and Society--Impact!
Article in PC World

1986 video games